The Ugandan Premier League, also known as the StarTimes Uganda Premier League for sponsorship reasons, is the top division of the Federation of Uganda Football Associations. The league was previously known as the Uganda Super League but changed in the 2014–15 season after new management taking over. The league's roots date back to 1968 when the National First Division League was established.

History

Original concept
The genesis of club football in Uganda was an idea copied from England by Balamaze Lwanga and Polycarp Kakooza. The objective was to improve Uganda's performances in the Africa Cup of Nations after disappointing results in the finals in 1962 (fourth-place finish) and 1968 (lost all three group stage matches), both held in Ethiopia. The intention was to start a Uganda National League (the forerunner of the Uganda Super League) to create the foundation for a strong national team. At the same time, the identification of players from the grassroots would be made easier and systematic.

Because there were no clubs to form a league, institutions and districts were contacted to form teams. The 1968 inaugural top-flight league was composed of Prisons, Army, Coffee, Express, Jinja, Masaka, Mbarara, and Mbale. There were three institutions and four districts and one club.  The league was known as the National First Division League, and the first league champions were Prisons FC Kampala (now known as Maroons FC).

After four seasons, the political turbulence in Uganda impacted on the league. The 1972 and 1973 championships were not completed because of civil unrest. In 1974, the league became known as the National Football League and this title was used until 1982 when the league was trimmed to ten teams and was renamed the Super League (shortened to Super Ten in that inaugural season).

Super League advent
The emergence of the Super League in 1982 saw the development of SC Villa as the country's leading club. Through the 1980s and a good part of the 1990s, competition between Express, KCC FC and SC Villa lit up the league and fans attended in hoards.

SC Villa won the league for the first time in 1982 and over the next 22 years totalled 16 league titles. KCC FC and Express won the championship title in the intervening years.

Match-fixing
In 2003, football in Uganda hit its lowest ebb as SC Villa put 22 goals past Akol FC when the league title went down to goal difference with Express. This was one of the biggest scandals in Ugandan football and thereafter, there was a complete media shutdown in all matters pertaining to local football. Fans became increasingly disillusioned and deserted the stadia thus affecting the teams financially. The episode represented one of many that has plagued Ugandan football.

Uganda Premier League
The 2018–19 Uganda Super League was contested by 16 teams. Ndejje University FC and Nyamityobora FC were promoted after winning their FUFA Big League groups, while Paidha Black Angels were promoted after winning the FUFA Big League promotion playoffs.

Participants and locations

Some of the Kampala clubs may on occasions also play home matches at the Mandela National Stadium.

Previous winners

1968–69 : Prisons FC (Kampala)
1969 : Prisons FC (Kampala)
1970 : Coffee United SC (Kakira)
1971 : Simba FC (Lugazi)
1974 : Express FC (Kampala)
1975 : Express FC (Kampala)
1976 : KCC FC (Kampala)
1977 : KCC FC (Kampala)
1978 : Simba FC (Lugazi)
1979 : Uganda Commercial Bank FC (Kampala)
1980 : Nile Breweries (Jinja)
1981 : KCC FC (Kampala)
1982 : SC Villa (Kampala)
1983 : KCC FC (Kampala)
1984 : SC Villa (Kampala)
1985 : KCC FC (Kampala)
1986 : SC Villa (Kampala)
1987 : SC Villa (Kampala)
1988 : SC Villa (Kampala)
1989 : SC Villa (Kampala)
1990 : SC Villa (Kampala)
1991 : KCC FC (Kampala)
1992 : SC Villa (Kampala)
1993 : Express (Kampala)
1994 : SC Villa (Kampala)
1995 : Express (Kampala)
1996 : Express (Kampala)
1997 : KCC FC (Kampala)
1998 : SC Villa (Kampala)
1999 : SC Villa (Kampala)
2000 : SC Villa (Kampala)
2001 : SC Villa (Kampala)
2002 : SC Villa (Kampala)
2002–03 : SC Villa (Kampala)
2004 : SC Villa (Kampala)
2005 : Police FC (Jinja)
2006 : Uganda Revenue Authority SC (Kampala)
2006–07 : Uganda Revenue Authority SC (Kampala)
2007–08 : KCC FC (Kampala)
2008–09 : Uganda Revenue Authority SC (Kampala)
2009–10 : Bunamwaya SC (Wakiso)
2010–11 : Uganda Revenue Authority SC (Kampala)
2011–12 : Express FC (Kampala)
2012–13 : KCC FC (Kampala)
2013–14 : KCC FC (Kampala)
2014–15 : Vipers SC (Wakiso)
2015–16 : KCCA FC (Kampala)
2016–17 : KCCA FC (Kampala)
2017–18 : Vipers SC (Wakiso)
2018–19 : KCCA FC (Kampala)
2019–20 : Vipers SC (Wakiso)
2020–21 : Express (Kampala)
2021–22 : Vipers SC (Wakiso)

Performances by club

Top scorers

Notes:
 Joy Ssebuliba was leading league scorer with 17 goals for Lint FC in 1973 but the league was not completed because of the dire political situation.

Hat-tricks

See also 

 Federation of Uganda Football Associations

References

External links
League at Fifa.com
RSSSF competition history

 
Football competitions in Uganda
Uganda
Sports leagues established in 1968
1968 establishments in Uganda